Marion Huse (1896-1967) was an American artist, known for painting and printmaking

Biography
Huse was born in 1896 in Lynn, Massachusetts. She studied at the New School of Design in Boston and the Carnegie Institute of Art and Technology.

Huse ran the Springfield Art School in Massachusetts from 1925 through 1940. In the 1930s she worked as an artist for the Works Progress Administration eventually becoming supervisor for the western part of Vermont. She was married to Robert Barstow and led a peripatetic life, traveling around the United States and Europe.

Huse was included in the 1947 and 1951 Dallas Museum of Fine Arts exhibitions of the National Serigraph Society.

Her work is included in the collections of the Fuller Museum of Art, the Library of Congress, the Museum of Fine Arts, Boston, and the Victoria and Albert Museum.

Huse died in 1967. Her papers are in the Archives of American Art at the Smithsonian Institution.

References

External links
 images of Huse's work at Artnet

1896 births
1967 deaths
Artists from Massachusetts
20th-century American women artists